"Oh Daddy" is a song written by Christine McVie that was first performed by the British-American rock band Fleetwood Mac as the tenth song off their 1977 album Rumours.

Background
Christine McVie wrote "Oh Daddy" for the band's drummer, Mick Fleetwood. At the time, Fleetwood was the only father in the band, with two daughters. Fleetwood has described the song as one of his favorite Fleetwood Mac songs of all time. However, both Lindsey Buckingham's former girlfriend Carol Ann Harris and Stevie Nicks' biographer Zoe Howe have written that the song was originally written for the band's lighting director, who McVie had been dating at the time. Both Harris and Howe contend McVie only later claimed that the song was written for Fleetwood.

Producer Ken Caillat described "Oh Daddy" as "a beautiful, airy song." He noted that getting the proper tempo was particularly tricky since it sounded rushed at a quicker tempo but lethargic at a slower pace.  Fleetwood Mac biographer Cath Carroll praised McVie's vocal and likened the song to a "sexy, old English version of The Rolling Stones' 'Fool to Cry'."

During the Rumours sessions, the band referred to the song as 'Addy' due to a technical mishap. Caillat had made the mistake while playing back a take. "We were going to do some overdubs, and while rewinding the tape, a portable tape oscillator fell on the machine, sending it into free-wheel – the reels were spinning out of control. I jumped on the machine to stop it - and snapped the tape! Oh, man... [laughs] We listened back and there it was: ‘Oh ‘addy.’ The ‘D’ part of Christine’s vocal was cut off. My heart sunk."

Near the end of one take, Christine McVie played random notes on her keyboard to grab the attention of the engineers in the control room. The band opted to keep these unplanned additions in the final version of the song.

In 1978, it was released as a single in Japan, with "I Don't Want to Know" as the B-side.

"Oh Daddy" was played consistently throughout the band's Rumours and Tusk world tours, and resurfaced for the 1997 The Dance tour before disappearing once again.

Personnel
Christine McVie – piano, Hammond B3, Moog, lead vocals
Mick Fleetwood – drums, castanets, gong
John McVie – bass guitar
Lindsey Buckingham – acoustic guitars, electric guitars, backing vocals
Stevie Nicks – backing vocals

References

1977 songs
Fleetwood Mac songs
Songs written by Christine McVie
Song recordings produced by Ken Caillat
Song recordings produced by Richard Dashut
1978 singles